Buleusa is a populated place in the Walikale Territory, the Democratic Republic of the Congo. It is home to a military camp run by the Armed Forces of the Democratic Republic of the Congo. In June 2016, between 3,000 and 4,000 Hutus were refugees in the camp; they were hiding from the Kobos, who were trying to chase them away from the territory.

References

Populated places in North Kivu